Iosif Iosifovich Charlemagne, or Sharleman (Russian:Иосиф Иосифович Шарлемань, 13 April 1824, Saint Petersburg - 8 May 1870, Saint Petersburg) was a Russian architect and painter of French ancestry; son of the architect Iosif Ivanovich Charlemagne.

Biography 
He began his education at Saint Peter's School, a German-language institution, then attended the Imperial Academy of Arts, where he studied architecture with Alexander Brullov. He graduated in 1846, with the title of "Free Artist". One of his first projects involved work on the "", which kept him occupied until 1851.

Later, he served as an assistant to Auguste de Montferrand, and helped to draft the plans for a monument to Tsar Nicholas I, under the direction of Nicholas Benois. His work was largely concerned with cost estimates and creating images of how the structures would look when completed. His private commissions were of a similar nature. One such project, a dacha for Grand Duke Mikhail Nikolayevich, earned him the title of "Academician" in 1857.

His fame rests largely on his watercolor drawings, which were very popular with patrons of the arts and members of the Royal Family, who often placed orders for them. During a stay abroad, in 1860, he painted a series of views of Germany for Grand Duchess Olga Feodorovna. Together with his brother, Adolf, a well-known painter, he created a circle of young artists, professional and amateur, who would meet in the evenings to draw. 

Sources
 Biography from the Русский биографический словарь @ Russian Wikisource
 Biography from the Большая биографическая энциклопедия @ Академик

External links 

1824 births
1870 deaths
Russian architects
Russian watercolorists
Russian people of French descent
Imperial Academy of Arts alumni
Artists from Saint Petersburg